Writing on the Wall is the fifth studio album by the British pop group Bucks Fizz.  It was released on 24 November 1986 and featured the comeback top ten single "New Beginning (Mamba Seyra)".  It was their first and only album to feature then new member Shelley Preston and their only album released on Polydor Records. Despite the album being initially unsuccessful in the charts, it was re-released twice - first in 2004 and again in 2012, both times with different track listings.  It was the group's final studio album until The Lost Masters series (2006–2013).

Overview
Writing on the Wall was a significant album in the Bucks Fizz catalogue for many reasons. Apart from being their final studio album, it was also the only one to feature newly recruited member Shelley Preston, who replaced Jay Aston a year before. It was also their first album on record label Polydor after their 5-year contract with RCA expired.
Despite this, the album contained three of its ten tracks from the RCA days. These were the first two singles, "You and Your Heart so Blue" and "Magical", along with a remix of "I Hear Talk", which was featured on their 1984 album of the same name, but included here as it had since become a big hit in the clubs in both the UK and US.

The biggest selling point of the album was the top ten comeback hit "New Beginning (Mamba Seyra)", released in May 1986. The song become their first big hit in some time and received some of their biggest critical acclaim. The group elected to release a cover version as the follow-up — a reworking of Stephen Stills' "Love the One You're With". The song stalled outside the top 40 and the next single, "Keep Each Other Warm", also failed to sell well.

The album, released in November 1986, could not sustain the comeback success of the "New Beginning" single and, despite positive reviews, didn't make a great impression on the charts. Because of this, a planned early 1987 single release of "Love in a World Gone Mad" was shelved. On original release the album was issued on Vinyl, Cassette and Compact Disc, all with slightly varied track listings. The Cassette version boasted a whole side of extended remixes (cramming nine of the vinyl's ten songs on side one), while the Compact Disc version contained a new song, "Give a Little Love", in favour of the "I Hear Talk" extended mix.

The album was re-issued on CD in 2004 with a very different track listing, featuring 1986-only tracks. Between 2004 and 2008, alternate versions of the tracks "New Beginning", "You and Your Heart So Blue", "Magical", "Keep Each Other Warm", "Love the One You're With" and "Love in a World Gone Mad" have been released on various Bucks Fizz compilations.

The album was re-released yet again on CD in April 2012. This time as an "Ultimate edition" 2-CD set. The first CD follows closely to the 2004 track listing, but with remastered sound (the 2004 edition had received fan criticism due to lack of bass), while the second CD featured the third volume of The Lost Masters albums.

"Love in a World Gone Mad" was covered by ABBA singer Agnetha Fältskog on her 1987 album I Stand Alone.

Reception and reviews
Writing on the Wall received some of the group's best reviews.
Smash Hits awarded the album an 8 out of 10 rating and singled out tracks "New Beginning", "You and your Heart so Blue" and "I Hear Talk" as being particularly strong. Reviewer Tom Hibbert said that "[their music] is awesomely brilliantly conceived pop music performed with relish", while the songs "are thoroughly ravishing, proper popular music". Number One magazine was impressed by the adult rock sound of many of the tracks, but feared that the album wouldn't stand up to repeated listenings. Nevertheless, they gave the album a 4 out of 5 rating, commenting that "Writing On the Wall sees  the Fizzers moving ever further away from their light pop of old, [giving] a fair impression of American AOR rockers – in the most melodic way possible of course". The newly established Q Magazine rated the album 3 out of 5 and favoured the tracks "Keep Each Other Warm" and "The Company You Keep". On the re-issue in 2004, The Daily Mirror stated that though the album may not be cutting-edge, it had class, while Music Week labelled the album "a gem". Reviewing the 2012 re-release, Music News.com said the album saw the group lose their identity in a largely negative review. The album was rated two stars out of five but did compliment the group's performance, stating "The band themselves are in pretty good form and the performances are solid but subtleties are clobbered by the production".

In their year-end polls, Number One magazine rated Bucks Fizz as the thirteenth best act of 1986, and placed the single, "New Beginning", fifteenth in the best songs of the year. "New Beginning" became a much played song on radio during 1986 and elicited many positive comments from DJs, while the song remains a firm fan favourite — widely regarded as their best song, ever.

Track listing

1986 vinyl

1986 Cassette

1986 CD

2004 CD

2012 "Ultimate edition"

Personnel
Vocals
Bobby G - lead vocals on "You and Your Heart so Blue", "Soul Motion", "Magical", "Keep Each Other Warm", "Love the One You're With", "Don't Turn Back", "I Hear Talk", "Too Hard" and "I Need Your Love", harmonica on "The Company You Keep"
Cheryl Baker - lead vocals on "Give a Little Love", "Love in a World Gone Mad" and "In Your Eyes"
Mike Nolan - lead vocals on "The Company You Keep"
Shelley Preston - shared lead vocal on "Love in a World Gone Mad" (1986 version) and "In Your Eyes"

Musicians
 Andy Hill - guitar, bass, keyboards
 Felix Krish - bass
Steve Price - bass
Andrew Paresi - drums
 Gary Wallis - drums, percussion
 Graham Broad - drums
 Tony Beard - drums
 Ian Bairnson - guitar
 J.J. Bell - guitar
 Matthew Cang - guitar 
 Alan Park - keyboards
 Danny Schogger - keyboards
 Nick Graham - keyboards
 Richard Cottle - keyboards
 Gary Hutchins - keyboard programming
 Peter Woodroffe - Fairlight programming
 Robert Lea - percussion
 Will Parnell - percussion
Gary Barnacle – saxophone
 Martin Dobson - saxophone
 Mel Collins - saxophone
 Peter Thoms - trombone
 John Thirkell - trumpet
 Luke Tunney - trumpet

Production
 Andy Hill - Producer on "New Beginning", "You and Your Heart so Blue", "Soul Motion", "Magical", "Keep Each Other Warm", "Love the One You're With", "I Hear Talk"
 Bobby G - Producer on "Don't Turn Back", "The Company You Keep"
 David Motion - Producer on "Love in a World Gone Mad"
 Mike Myers - Producer on "New Beginning"
 Trevor Vallis - Producer on "Soul Motion", Engineer
 Brian Tench - Engineer
 David "Trigger" Fraser - Engineer
 Peter Woodroffe - Engineer
 Michael Hoppen - Photography
 Green Ink - Design
 Alwyn Clayden - Art direction

Chart performance

References

1986 albums
Bucks Fizz albums
Polydor Records albums